Chixtape III is a mixtape by Canadian rapper Tory Lanez; it was released on December 25, 2015. It is the sequel to Chixtape II released in March 2014. The album includes a guest appearance from Ed Sheeran and production from Play Picasso, Happy Perez, Lavi$h, Sergio Romero and Lanez himself.

Release and promotion 
On December 22, 2015, Tory Lanez announced was going to release two mixtapes on Christmas, Chixtape III and The New Toronto. He also revealed the album covers that day.

Track listing

 Notes:

 "Looks" as a sample of "Disrespectful" by Trey Songz feat. Mila J

References

2015 mixtape albums
Tory Lanez albums
Sequel albums
Albums produced by Happy Perez